Singapore Badminton Association (abbreviation: SBA) is the national governing body for badminton in Singapore.  It governs, encourages and develops the sport throughout the country.

Founded in 1929, the SBA is an affiliate of the Singapore National Olympic Council (SNOC). It is also a member of the Badminton World Federation (BWF) and Badminton Asia, which was formerly known as the Badminton Asian Confederation.

As of 2021, the SBA has a total of 32 member clubs across the country. It closely liaises with the member clubs to provide support to the club and league structures.

History

Formation
After its introduction by the British and the Amateur Sporting Association in the 1920s, badminton gained widespread popularity throughout Singapore. It was against this backdrop that the SBA was established several years later in 1929, with Tan Boo Teck as its inaugural president. Upon its formation, the SBA allowed badminton parties, which were essentially teams consisting of badminton enthusiasts, to affiliate themselves with them and take part in their annual open championships.

Following the Japanese Occupation, the SBA had to deal with the loss of some of its best players to the war, the lack of proper facilities and the rising cost of maintaining the club. Nevertheless, Malaya, which Singapore was then a part of, prepared to send its first team to the 1949 Thomas Cup. The team eventually emerged victorious, beating Denmark 8–1 in the finals held in England.

At the time, the lack of proper facilities meant that the SBA's players started practicing in open-air courts. SBA meetings were also mainly held at the Clerical Union Hall. The Thomas Cup win, however, kicked off a fundraiser to build a badminton hall. Despite the donations, the SBA struggled with the cost of the construction and had to relinquish ownership of the badminton hall to the Singapore Sports Council (now known as Sport Singapore). Eventually, the Singapore Badminton Hall, which also doubled as the SBA's headquarters, was opened in 1952.

In January 2008, the SBA's lease at the Singapore Badminton Hall expired. The SBA then relocated to the Singapore Sports School. The SBA is currently located at the Singapore Sports Hub, after the latter's construction was completion in 2014.

Post-independence success
Badminton would experience a revival in Singapore after the 1983 Southeast Asian Games, when Wong Shoon Keat won the gold medal at the men's singles.

In 2021, Loh Kean Yew made history by becoming the men's singles world champion, winning the title at the 2021 BWF World Championships, becoming the first Singaporean to achieve this feat.

SBA Badminton Academy
In 2017, the SBA launched the Singapore Badminton Academy in partnership with ActiveSG. The academy, headed by former Olympian Jiang Yanmei, offers a series of badminton programmes across Singapore for aspiring shuttlers aged six to 17. Many former national shuttlers are part of the academy's coaching team.

Presidents

Tournaments
The SBA is involved in a number of tournaments throughout the year.

Singapore Open
The Singapore Open is a BWF-sanctioned tournament organised by the SBA. It has been categorised as a BWF World Tour Super 500 event since the BWF announced its new events structure in 2018. The tournament, which offered a total prize money of US$355,000 in its 2019 edition, attracts some of the world's best shuttlers.

Singapore International 
The Singapore International or Singapore Satellite, Cheers Asian Satellite is an open international badminton tournament in Singapore. In the last few years, this tournament has been categorised by BWF as International Series level.

Singapore National Championships
The National Open Championships is a Tier 1 SBA Tournament, with the highest ranking points under the National Ranking System.

Other SBA Sanctioned Tournaments
The following tournaments, all of which are tier 2 and below events, are currently sanctioned by the SBA:
 Alpha Age Group Series
 Brave Sword Series
 Papago Badminton Carnival 
 Pesta Sukan (Badminton)
 Chinese Swimming Club Age Group Tournament
 Berita Harian / Pilot Pen / Ashaway Youth Games
 KSA Challenge

Notable Shuttlers
Many shuttlers have represented Singapore on the world stage, both prior and after the nation gained independence.

Pre-independence
 Alice Pennefather
 E. J. Vass
 Ismail Marjan
 Ong Poh Lim
 Tan Chong Tee
 Wong Peng Soon

Post-independence
 Wong Shoon Keat
 Li Li
 Fu Mingtian
 Loh Kean Yew
 Terry Hee
 Tan Wei Han

Olympians
Below is the list of Olympians that had represented Singapore over the years:
 Loh Kean Yew (Tokyo ’20)
 Yeo Jia Min (Tokyo ’20)
 Liang Xiaoyu (Rio de Janeiro ’16)
 Derek Wong Zi Liang (Rio de Janeiro ’16, London ’12)
 Gu Juan (London ’12)
 Yao Lei (London ’12)
 Shinta Mulia Sari (London ’12)
 Hendri Kurniawan Saputra (Beijing ’08)
 Xing Aiying (Beijing ’08)
 Li Yujia (Beijing ’08)
 Jiang Yanmei (Beijing ’08, Athens ’04)
 Ronald Susilo (Beijing ’08, Athens ’04)
 Li Li (Athens ’04)
 Zarinah Abdullah (Atlanta ’96, Barcelona ’92)
 Hamid Khan (Barcelona ’92)
 Donald Koh (Barcelona ’92)

See also
 Singapore National Badminton Team
 Singapore Open
 Singapore International
 Singapore National Championships

References

National members of the Badminton World Federation
Sport in Singapore
1929 establishments in Singapore